Michelle Brandstrup (born 24 September 1987) is a Danish handball player who plays for Ringkøbing Håndbold.

References

1987 births
Living people
People from Aarhus Municipality
Danish female handball players
Sportspeople from the Central Denmark Region